Billy Taylor Trio at Town Hall (also released as Live! at Town Hall) is a live album by American jazz pianist Billy Taylor recorded in 1954 and released on the Prestige label.

Track listing
All compositions by Billy Taylor except as indicated
 "A Foggy Day" (George Gershwin, Ira Gershwin) - 3:31  
 "I'll Remember April" (Gene de Paul,  Patricia Johnston, Don Raye) - 4:09  
 "Sweet Georgia Brown" (Ben Bernie, Kenneth Casey, Maceo Pinkard) - 5:04  
 "How High the Moon" (Nancy Hamilton, Morgan Lewis) - 13:06  
 "Theodora" - 4:39

Personnel 
Billy Taylor - piano
Earl May - bass
Percy Brice - drums

References 

1955 live albums
Prestige Records live albums
Billy Taylor live albums
Albums recorded at the Town Hall